Clare's Law, often known officially as a Domestic Violence Disclosure Scheme or similar, designates several ways for police officers to disclose a person's history of abusive behaviour to those who may be at risk from such behaviour. It is intended to reduce intimate partner violence. Clare's Law is named after Clare Wood, a woman murdered in England by a former domestic partner who police knew to be dangerous.

Clare's Law has two main elements: a 'right to ask', which allows members of the public, including a domestic partner, to request information from the police about a potential abuser; and a 'right to know', which, in certain circumstances, permits police to disclose such information to the public on their own initiative.  

First implemented in England and Wales in 2014, the policy structure has since been adopted or proposed in various forms elsewhere in the United Kingdom as well as in Australia and Canada. Despite its name, Clare's Law need not—and often does not—take the form of a statute. Instead, it may be implemented as a policy document or guidance issued by a government authority to police departments.

History and nomenclature 
Clare's Law is named after Clare Wood, who was murdered at age 36 by George Appleton, an ex-boyfriend, in Salford, England in February 2009. Appleton strangled and burned Wood. Appleton killed himself several days after murdering Wood. 

Appleton had seriously abused women in the past and the Greater Manchester Police (GMP) were aware of his violent history. Appleton had served three prison sentences before his relationship with Wood: six months for failure to comply with a restraining order; two years for harassment; and six years 'for holding a woman at knife-point for 12 hours'. Following her death, Wood's family stated that she would not have entered into a relationship with Appleton had she known of his violent past.

In a report on Wood's case, the Independent Police Complaints Commission noted that there had been 'individual failings by officers who demonstrated in some cases a shocking lack of understanding about the nature of domestic violence'. In this connection, one commentator has noted that, given the GMP's failure, it is unclear whether Clare's Law alone would have prevented Wood's murder. Following Wood's death, her father campaigned to create legal means for police to warn potential targets of abuse of their partners' violent pasts.

Historically, police in England and Wales have not responded effectively to domestic abuse. A 2014 report by Her Majesty's Inspectorate of Constabulary concluded that:The overall police response to victims of domestic abuse is not good enough. Unacceptable failings in core policing activities, investigating crime, preventing crime, bringing offenders to justice and keeping victims safe are the principal reasons for this.In the United Kingdom, the Domestic Violence, Crime and Victims Act 2004 and the 2011 policy document Call to end violence against women and girls represent some recent attempts to combat domestic abuse. Additionally, the Crime and Security Act 2010 created two new legal structures—the domestic violence protection notice (DVPN) and domestic violence protection order (DVPO)—intended to protect potential targets of abuse from violence.

Background

Intimate partner violence 

Intimate partner violence contributes to significant gender-based disparities in the distribution of homicides. From 2018–19, 48 percent of adult female homicide victims in the United Kingdom were killed by a current or former domestic partner. In the same year, 8 percent of adult male victims were killed by an intimate partner. In Canada from 2008–18, female victims constituted 79 percent of deaths due to intimate partner violence. In Australia in 2018, 53 percent of victims of family and domestic violence–related homicide were women.

Legal precedents 
Fitz-Gibbon and Walklate suggest that sex offender registries and related community notification laws, which allow members of the public to be informed if a sex offender lives in their area, resemble Clare's Law in that they involve the disclosure of information about a potential offender to a potential target of abuse or violence. However, they also note that 'sex offender schemes are community focused, while the domestic violence disclosure scheme is individual focused'.

Privacy issues 
Disclosure of information about a person by police raises privacy issues under English common law and Article 8 of the European Convention on Human Rights. The Royal Canadian Mounted Police declined to participate in Saskatchewan's version of Clare's Law due to concerns about violating Canadian federal privacy laws.

Structure and implementation 
Whether adopted by statute or as a matter of policing policy, Clare's Law has two main elements:

 the 'right to ask', which allows members of the public, including but not limited to a potential target of abuse or violence, to request and (in some cases) receive information from the police regarding another person's history of violence or abusive behaviour, including such person's criminal record; and
 the 'right to know', which allows police to inform a potential target of a threat on their own initiative.

Various Commonwealth jurisdictions have adopted programmes with this basic structure.

Australia 

Several Australian states have proposed or implemented versions of Clare's Law.

South Australia launched a 12-month pilot of Clare's Law in October 2018. Such a programme had been considered in the state since at least 2015.

Mike Baird's Liberals promised a version of Clare's Law during the 2015 New South Wales state election. The scheme was adopted in April 2016 and subsequently extended to June 2019.

The Liberal National Party of Queensland promised to implement Clare's Law in the run-up to the 2017 Queensland state election.

Canada 
Versions of Clare's Law have been adopted, or are under consideration, in a number of Canadian provinces. By contrast with the United Kingdom, Canadian jurisdictions have typically adopted Clare's Law by statute. 

Saskatchewan, which, had more reported cases of domestic violence per capita than any other province, is the first province in Canada to implement Clare's Law. The province's Interpersonal Violence Disclosure Protocol (Clare's Law) Act received royal assent on 15 May 2019 and came into force on 29 June 2020. Under the Saskatchewan statute, a number of different parties have a 'right to ask', including 'the police, the person at risk, family members, medical professionals and shelter workers, among others'. , the RCMP had stated that it would not honour requests for information made pursuant to Clare's Law in Saskatchewan, as it is bound by federal privacy law.

A version of Clare's Law was passed in the House of Assembly of Newfoundland and Labrador in November 2019. It received royal assent on 6 December 2019. , it had not yet come into force.

Alberta's governing United Conservative Party tabled a version of Clare's Law in October 2019. The law came into force on 1 April 2021.

The Manitoba Progressive Conservative Party spoke in favour of adopting a version of Clare's Law in Manitoba during the 2019 general election.

United Kingdom 

Versions of Clare's Law have been adopted in England and Wales (2014), Scotland (2016), and Northern Ireland (2018).

Clare's Law was adopted on International Women's Day (8 March) 2014 throughout England and Wales, after public consultation beginning in late 2011 and a pilot programme in selected areas. As implemented in the English context, it is not a statute. Rather, it is a policy promulgated by the Home Office—an 'information-sharing mechanism'—known officially as the Domestic Violence Disclosure Scheme (DVDS). 

Before DVDS was adopted, police in England and Wales were able to disclose information about potential offenders to the public as a matter of discretion. The Home Office favoured a more regimented scheme, in part to ensure that police disclosure complied with legislation including the Data Protection Act 1998 and Human Rights Act 1998. 

DVDS provides guidance to the police in exercising their common law powers to warn the public about a potential threat, in the specific context of domestic abuse. Courts have held that the exercise of such powers by the police must conform to three criteria: 'relevancy', 'necessity', and 'proportionality'. 'Relevancy' requires police to disclose only pertinent information regarding the person about whom information is sought; 'necessity' requires disclosure only when there is a clear 'social need' for it; and 'proportionality' requires that the person about whom information is sought is informed or otherwise engaged in the process, if possible.  

Under DVDS, both 'right to ask' and 'right to know' requests are submitted to a review panel to determine whether the relevant information should be disclosed. In the year ending March 2018, 57 percent of reported 'right to know' requests and 44 percent of reported 'right to ask' requests had resulted in a disclosure.

Effectiveness and reactions 
It is not clear whether Clare's Law reduces the rate of homicide due to intimate partner violence, or whether disclosures that are made pursuant to Clare's Law induce their recipients to seek further assistance.

Fitz-Gibbon and Walklate note that Clare Wood, in particular, appears to have been 'acutely aware' that Appleton was violent. Thus, they point out, the problem Wood faced may not have been a lack of information, but rather a lack of 'support' from others around her, and a lack of effective police operations in the domestic violence context. Walklate has noted elsewhere that women may not want to know information about their partners' past, or may choose to remain in a relationship despite receiving such information.

Carline and Dehaghani observe that, by effectively deputizing women to remove themselves from abusive relationships, Clare's Law 'responsibilizes' women for dealing with abuse and, accordingly, may divert attention and resources from state-funded support mechanisms.  

Refuge has spoken against Clare's Law on several occasions, suggesting that it does not address the root problems associated with intimate partner violence.

See also 

 Domestic violence in the United Kingdom
 Domestic violence in Australia
 Jessica's Law
 Megan's Law
 Sarah's Law

Notes

Explanatory notes

References

Bibliography

External links 
 Domestic violence disclosure scheme: guidance (England and Wales)
 Interpersonal Violence Disclosure Protocol Act (Newfoundland and Labrador)
 Interpersonal Violence Disclosure Protocol (Clare's Law) Act (Saskatchewan)
Saskatchewan law
Newfoundland and Labrador law
New South Wales law
English law
Scottish laws
Law of Northern Ireland
South Australia law